The Denmark men's national under-19 volleyball team represents Denmark in international men's volleyball competitions and friendly matches under the age 19 and it is ruled and managed by the Danish Volleyball Federation That is an affiliate of Federation of International Volleyball FIVB and also a part of European Volleyball Confederation CEV.

Results

Summer Youth Olympics
 Champions   Runners up   Third place   Fourth place

FIVB U19 World Championship
 Champions   Runners up   Third place   Fourth place

Europe U19 / U18 Championship
 Champions   Runners up   Third place   Fourth place

Team

Current squad

References

External links
Official website
FIVB profile

National men's under-19 volleyball teams
Volleyball
Volleyball in Denmark